Phellodon plicatus is a species of tooth fungus in the family Bankeraceae. Found in Australia, it was first described in 1925 by Curtis Gates Lloyd as a species of Hydnum. Dutch mycologist Rudolph Arnold Maas Geesteranus transferred it to the genus Phellodon in 1966.

References

External links

Fungi described in 1925
Fungi of Australia
Inedible fungi
plicatus